The 2014 Tipperary Senior Hurling Championship was the 124th staging of the Tipperary Senior Hurling Championship since its establishment by the Tipperary County Board in 1887. The championship began on 12 April 2014 and ended on 2 November 2014.

Loughmore-Castleiney were the defending champions. Thurles Sarsfields won the title following a 2-22 to 3-11 defeat of Loughmore-Castleiney in the final.

Format

The 2014 championship saw a restructuring of the format, with teams graded based on their 2013 Championship performance. 32 teams contested the championship, with teams split into Roinn I and Roinn II.

Roinn I

In this section sixteen teams were divided into four groups of four. One team from each seeding was chosen per group.

Roinn I
Seed 1: 4 county semi-finalists from 2013
Seed 2: 4 county quarter-finalists from 2013
Seed 3: 4 county Round 4 Losers 2013
Seed 4: 4 county Round 3 Losers 2013

Progress 
The top two teams in each group qualify for the last sixteen. The bottom teams are assigned to Roinn II for the 2015 championship.

Roinn II

In this section sixteen teams were divided into four groups of four. One team from each seeding was chosen per group.

Roinn II
Seed 1: 4 Round 2 losers from 2013
Seed 2: 4 Round 2 losers from 2013
Seed 3: 4 Round 1 losers from 2013
Seed 4: 3 Round 1 losers from 2013 plus the 2013 intermediate champions

Progress 
The top team in each group qualifies for the last sixteen and are also promoted to Roinn I for 2015. Two out of the last placed teams in each group will be contest the relegation section.

Divisional championship

Each Tipperary divisional championship in 2014 was operated on a knock-out plus a loser’s group format. The four divisional champions will compete in the last sixteen. If a divisional champion also wins Roinn I or Roinn II then the next highest-ranked team progresses.

Last sixteen

The last sixteen of the championship will feature the four divisional champions, four Roinn II group winners, four Roinn I group winners and four Roinn I second-placed teams.

Fixtures and results

Roinn I: Group 1

Roinn I: Group 2

Roinn I: Group 3

Roinn I: Group 4

Roinn II: Group 1

Roinn II: Group 2

Roinn II: Group 3

Roinn II: Group 4

Relegation play-offs

Round of 16

Quarter-finals

Semi-finals

Final

References

Tipperary Senior Hurling Championship
Tipperary Senior Hurling Championship